SS Barnsley was a passenger and cargo vessel built for the Manchester, Sheffield and Lincolnshire Railway in 1876.

History

Barnsley was built by John Elder and Company of Govan, Scotland, and launched on 20 May 1876 By Miss Jamieson. She was intended for the services from Grimsby, England, to Hamburg, Germany, and Antwerp, Belgium.

In 1889 she was sold to A Gomez, Lisbon, Portugal, and renamed Gomes VI. She was sold again in 1898 to Empreza de Navegação por Vapor para o Algarve e Guadiana, Lisbon, and then in 1905 through J Soares Franco, João Fonseca e Sá, to Empreza Nacional de Navegação, all in Lisbon. She was renamed Lobito.

Lobito sank on 4 February 1909 at Ilha do Maio in the Cape Verde Islands while on passage from São Vicente for Cape Verde.

References

1876 ships
Steamships of the United Kingdom
Ships built on the River Clyde
Ships of the Manchester, Sheffield and Lincolnshire Railway
Maritime incidents in 1909
Shipwrecks in the Atlantic Ocean
Shipwrecks of Africa